Alexandre-Frédéric-Jacques Masson, marquis de Pezay, (27 April 1741 – 6 December 1777) was an 18th-century French soldier, courtier and man of letters.

Works 
1768: Zélis au bain, Paris, 1763, 1766, in-8. This poem, in four books, was written with enough natural but in a too free tone; the author, who worked ceaselessly his works, reworked it, changed the outcome and added two songs (la Nouvelle Zélis au bain, Geneva, in-8).
1764: Le Pot-pourri, épître à qui on voudra, Paris, Sébastien Jorry.
1764: Lettre d'Alcibiade à Glicère, Paris, Sébastien Jorry, in-12.
1767: Lettre d'Ovide à Julie, in-8.
1767: Suite des Bagatelles anonymes (by Dorat), Paris, in-8.
1770: La Closière ou le Vin nouveau, opéra comique, Paris, in-8.
1771: Éloge de Fénelon, Paris, in-8.
1771: Les Soirées helvétiennes, alsaciennes et franc-comtoises, Paris, in-8; London, 1772, 2 vol. in-12.
1771: Les Tableaux, followed by Histoire de Mlle de Syanne et du comte de Marcy, Paris, in-8;
1771: Traduction en prose de Catullus, Tibullus and Gallus, Paris, 1771, 1794, 2 vol. in-8 et in-12.
1773: La Rosière de Salenci, opéra lyrique, Paris, in-8. The music by Grétry made the success of this work.
1775: Histoire des campagnes de Maillebois en Italie en 1745 et 1746, Paris, 3 vol. in-4 and atlas.
1775: Journal militaire ou relation détaillée des campagnes de M. le maréchal de Maillebois en Italie: précédé et suivi d'un précis historique de cette guerre.

A selection of his Œuvres was published (Liège, 1791, 2 vol. in-12), preceded by a historical and literary note. Masson de Pezay also contributed articles to the Encyclopédie by Diderot and D'Alembert.

Bibliography 
 Ferdinand Hoefer, Nouvelle Biographie générale, t. 39, Paris, Firmin-Didot, 1862, p. 790-1.
 André Grétry, "Notice sur Pezay", in La rosière de Salenci, pastorale en trois actes.
 Jean-Nicolas Dufort de Cheverny, Mémoires sur les règnes de Louis XV et Louis XVI et sur la Révolution, Paris, Plon, Nourrit et Cie, 1886. 
 Mémoires de Louis XVIII recueillis et mis en ordre par M. le duc de D****, 1832-1833, (2 t.).
 Mémoires du duc de Lauzun et du comte de Tilly, 1862.
 Saint-Albin Berville, François Barrière, Collection des mémoires relatifs à la révolution française, 1827.
 Pierre-Marie-Michel Lepeintre-Desroches, Suite du Répertoire du Théâtre Français: avec un choix des pièces de plusieurs autres théâtres, vol. 30, 1823.
 Rodolphe Reuss, Le Marquis de Pezay: un touriste parisien en Alsace au XVIIIe, 1876.
 Michaud, Biographie universelle ancienne et moderne ou Histoire, par ordre alphabétique, de la vie publique et privée de tous les hommes qui se sont fait remarquer par leurs écrits, leurs actions, leurs talents, leurs vertus ou leurs crimes: PARM-PF, 1823.

References

External links 
 Bibliothèque Dauphinoise, Alexandre-Frédéric-Jacques Masson, marquis de Pezay (biographie)
 Alexandre-Frédéric-Jacques Masson de Pezay on Data.bnf.fr

18th-century French male writers
18th-century French poets
French opera librettists
Contributors to the Encyclopédie (1751–1772)
18th-century French military personnel
French Army officers
1741 births
People from Versailles
1777 deaths